Edirne Şehir station is the smaller of the two railway stations in Edirne. The station has one side platform servicing one track and was opened in 1971, along with the Edirne cut-off. Edirne Şehir is serviced by one train a day, the Istanbul-Kapıkule Regional.

References

Railway stations in Edirne Province
Railway stations opened in 1971
1971 establishments in Turkey
Buildings and structures in Edirne